Duke Thomas is a fictional character appearing in comics published by DC Comics. He was created by Scott Snyder and Greg Capullo. He was introduced as a supporting character of Batman, his first appearance being in 2013 in Batman (vol. 2) #21, before later leading a youth vigilante movement inspired by Robin, in the comic book We Are... Robin, in May 2015. He officially became Batman's newest partner and joined the Batman family in 2016.

The character would be a staple in Batman comics and Detective Comics, and went on in a new role as Gotham's daylight protector, The Signal.

Publication history
Duke Thomas first appeared as an unnamed child in Batman (vol. 2) #21 (March 2014), being saved by Batman. His first official named appearance was in Batman (vol. 2) #30, revealing they had met before his prior appearance, as his parents saved Bruce Wayne's life.

He did not appear in comics again until Batman: Endgame (October 2014), where the Joker abducted him and his parents in an attempt to psychologically torture Batman. He returns as a staple in DC Comics in We Are... Robin, joining the teen vigilante group and being trained by previous official Robins during Robin War. His official debut as a part of the Batman family occurred in 2016, with Batman: Rebirth #1. He later makes a new mantle "The Signal" in the mini series Batman and The Signal.

He is currently a staple in Batman comics and comics featuring The Outsiders.

Fictional character biography

Batman: Zero Year

Duke's first appearance is as an unnamed child, fishing in the derelict Gotham City. He is approached by thugs wanting to take his food, who are stopped by the sudden appearance of Batman. Duke tells him that the Riddler claims that he is dead, to which Batman replies that it means he will not see him coming.

A later issue shows a flashback, revealing that Duke's parents saved Bruce Wayne in the immediate aftermath of the hurricane caused by the Riddler. Duke tells him that he is training his mind to be able to make an unsolvable riddle that will set the city free, showcasing his heroic nature.

Batman: Endgame

The Joker releases a deadly pathogen on Gotham City, which mimics his laugh gas on a much larger and infective scale. In the ensuing pandemonium, he kidnaps the Thomas family due to their connection with Bruce Wayne. He sets up an elaborate stage on which to reenact the night the Waynes died, even going as far as to use an infected Joe Chill, the man who originally killed his parents, in order to emotionally torture Bruce.

Duke is narrowly saved by Batman, but is forced to leave his parents behind to an infected mob.

We Are... Robin

Several months later, Duke is in the foster care system. He rebels as he feels frustrated by the lack of care and empathy the city has been granting to the Joker's victims, resulting in his parents still being missing. Alongside this, Gotham City appears to have been abandoned by Batman. However Alfred Pennyworth in disguise has been supplying teens fighting back against crime and corruption with Robin insignia and instructions via an app called "The Nest", starting the group known as We Are Robin.

After assisting the group, Duke is approached by Alfred, disguised as a police interrogator. He encourages Duke to take his life into his own hands and to fight for the fate of the city, offering him help finding his parents if he helps stop a cult from detonating bombs around the city. Duke accepts, making him an unofficial Robin. He leads part of the group to the bombs inside a train station. While the rest of the group is above ground fighting off the cultists, they are able to defuse one bomb. As they debate about how to defuse the second, they are sent a message from the nest, telling them to give up and get on the next train. Meanwhile, above ground the GCPD reveals a "new" Batman, who is simply Jim Gordon in a robotic suit. He is instructed to treat the Robins as criminals. One member, Troy, stays behind, and attempts to defuse the bomb in the same manner as the first one, causing it to detonate and kill him. Duke and his new friends are devastated, and become suspicious of The Nest, until Alfred provides them gear, and draws on their individual experiences to encourage them to keep fighting for their city.

After the events of Robin War, most Robins go back to their normal lives. Duke resumes his search for his parents, and finds them in a temporary shelter. But, due to long exposure to the Joker virus, they will suffer from the effects permanently. Meanwhile, John "Smiley" Bender Jr., a teen with Möbius syndrome, whose parents forced him into surgery that left him with a permanent smile, kills them after getting out of juvie. Holding the Joker as an idol, he starts a gang and begins terrorizing Gotham. Smiley invades Duke's school, forcing him and his friends to take action. After taking him down, they are approached by Alfred once more, where they officially renounce being Robins, instead deciding to rely on themselves and each other.

Robin War

Shortly after the death of Troy, a Robin outside of Duke's group accidentally kills a robber and police officer. Combining the two with public push, the Robin laws go into effect, making it illegal for teens to wear the Robin colors and insignia. It is quickly revealed that this is the result of manipulations by the Court of Owls, as the councilwoman who headed the legislation, Noctua, wishes to earn a place in the society.

Duke hosts a meeting of the remaining Robins, calling for whoever accidentally committed the crime to come forward. However the real Robin, Damian Wayne, crashes the meeting. Objecting to the use of his title while he was away, he challenges the Robins to prove themselves in a fight against him. The commotion is noticed by the GCPD, who send "Batman" to deal with them. He is quickly struck down by Damian, but before the fight can resume, Red Hood and Red Robin put a stop to it. They calm Damian down and call the first Robin, Dick Grayson.

Afterwards, Travis, one of the Robins, tells Duke that he was the one who killed the officer and robber. Duke seeing that it was an accident and that Travis is burdened by the guilt, encourages him to turn himself in and Travis agrees. While on his way, Travis is killed by a Talon in order to sow more public unrest. The official Robins train the group. Despite having faked his death and using a face changer, Duke recognizes Dick Grayson and reveals this during a training session. Duke and his friends are chosen as the best of the group, and are taken on a mission to try and get information. However Dick has been feeding information to the police, as to have the Robins arrested and safe from the Court of Owls.

The original Robins, with help from Duke and his friends, manage to break out and free the rest of the Robins. They tell the others to go home, as the Court of Owls is too deadly of an enemy for them. Thanks to information from Duke's friend Riko, they make their way to Gotham Academy. On the way, Damian sneaks away and is manipulated into joining the court in order to protect Gotham. He, alongside several Talons, fight against the others once they reach Gotham Academy, seeming to take them out with ease. Duke refuses to believe that Damian has genuinely joined the court, getting back up to continue fighting him. He calls Damian by name, saying that he knows of Bruce Wayne's amnesia as the result of sacrificing himself, and how Damian does not need to live up to that. This causes Damian to snap out of the Court's manipulations. The Robins that went home see the destruction throughout the city, they decide to rally once more and the tides turn against the Court, temporarily sending them back underground.

Batman Vol 9: Bloom
After Robin War a new threat arises in a man who is doling out devices that give powers, however, they are experimental and are just as likely to kill their host. He calls himself Mister Bloom.

After overhearing a conversation between Bruce and Jim Gordon, Duke becomes drawn to the mystery. He steals a neutralized device given to Bruce, as Bruce is reluctant to be involved in the case. He first shows the device to his older friend Daryl Gutierrez, a tech genius working as an engineer for the GCPD, who is unable to identify it.

Duke turns to other sources, tracking a trail to the Penguin's Iceberg Lounge. He finds a book containing information on Penguin's own investigations on Bloom. The Penguin and his gang find Duke in the study, nearly capturing him. He barely escapes, only to be seemly apprehended by guards outside. Until Bruce Wayne takes them down. Bruce had discovered the device missing, and since Duke had used the Fox Center's computers for his research, was able to deduce what he was doing and follow him.

He expresses concern for Duke, he continues to press when Duke tries to avoid the conversation, asking why Duke has treated him coldly. Duke becomes upset, as he is aware of Bruce's former identity as Batman while Bruce is not. He tells Bruce that he does not take a real look at his life, saying that his denial is based in selfishness. He tells Bruce that anyone can be who he is now, but in his old life only he could be him, and that he used to inspire the whole city. He continues with his speech, causing a spark in Bruce's memory when he saves Duke from an incoming train. Duke, feeling no better, tells Bruce to stay away.

After a text from Daryl, he visits his parents. Devastated by their mental state. Afterwards he sneaks onto the GCPD blimp Daryl was piloting, he informs Daryl of their condition.

He tells Daryl that it almost made him give up hope and vigilantism entirely, however, he went over the evidence he stole from the Iceberg Lounge one last time, and noticed that it contained the names of the nominees for the grant that Daryl won years before. He asks Daryl what is going on, Daryl snaps and his form begins to mutilate to where he looks eerily similar to Bloom. He reveals that he was the "original" Bloom, having initially created the devices after Zero Year. Believing that with powers people would band together to protect each other. But his first test with his cousin yielded fatal results. Which made Daryl burn the remaining devices.

After Batman's disappearance following Endgame, he turned towards his experiments again. This time using unidentified and near death patients. There was only one success, who became horrifically deformed, and slaughtered the other patients. The patient somehow recognized Daryl as the source of what happened to them, and decided to take the Bloom moniker, along with the rest of the devices.

Daryl insists that he can stop Bloom and perfect the devices. Duke tries to reason with him, saying that powers are not necessary and all you need is good people. Daryl mocks him and the Robin movement. He moves to take and dispose of a Robin pin that Duke gave him, but Duke takes advantage of his distraction to incapacitate him and take control of the airship.

During Daryl's confession, Bloom has begun widespread havoc across the city. Introducing handpicked convicts they have used the devices on. They inform the populace that they have hidden devices all over the city, and that they now have a programmed thrall to encourage their use, as the use of them makes Bloom stronger. Along with sabotaging the GCPD's atom collider, which could cause a black hole.

Duke directs the airship to where Bruce, having remembered being Batman, is struggling to hold them off. Duke uses the high powered magnets in the ship to grab onto Bloom. The more Bloom struggles, the stronger the magnets get, this also disables the thrall, leading to people removing their devices and diverting power from Bloom. Gordon uses a dampener on the collider, and the resounding shock wave kills Bloom. Leaving Gotham in peace once more.

Afterwards, Duke is approached by Bruce, who offers to train him as an official vigilante.

All-Star Batman

Duke becomes an official member of the Batman Family. After accepting Bruce's offer to train under him, Duke moves into Wayne Manor and begins working alongside all of Gotham's vigilantes. He is a heavy feature in All-Star Batman, assisting Bruce in dealing with Two-Face, Victor Zsasz, Hugo Strange, and Mr. Freeze.

Dark Days: The Road to Metal

Leading into the events of Dark Nights: Metal, while Batman was on a mission related to the mysteries surrounding Nth Metal, Duke was tasked to guard the Batcave. This led to a confrontation with the Green Lantern, Hal Jordan, who had been sent by The Guardians of the Universe to investigate sinister cosmic omens pointing to that location. Duke joined the investigation and together they found a secret level of Batcave. In the hidden level were various clues that Batman had collected and stored over the years related to Nth Metal, as well as a prison holding the Joker.

The Joker taunts the heroes into freeing him using the secrets he has learned from the cave. He reveals the origins of metahumans, and that Batman recruited Duke because Duke and his mother are metahumans who are connected to a "Dark Crisis". In the chaos of their fight, The Joker destroyed Batman's machines before escaping the two heroes and vanishing from the cave entirely. Batman arrives and confirms there is some truth to what the Joker said. Duke's powers begin to manifest, and using a Green Lantern ring and the power of the Shazam's dagger, the trio unknowingly set off the chain of events leading to the invasion of Barbatos and the Dark Multiverse.

Batman & The Signal
After studying under Batman for over a year, Bruce surprised him with his very own base of operation and an upgraded suit; congratulating him for completing his training. Duke took the codename The Signal and began his mission as the daylight protector of Gotham, recruiting his former Robin gang teammates Riko Sheridan and Izzy Ortiz for technical support.

Duke's first solo mission as The Signal was to investigate the sudden spike in dead metahuman bodies being discovered all throughout The Narrows. This led Signal into conflict with The Null, a metahuman from the Arkham Juvenile Detention Center aka "Juvie Arkham". After defeating Null, Signal decided to investigate further into Juvie Arkham, which had once been the old Gotham solarium before being reworked to house metahuman delinquents. Duke used his Ghost Vision to infiltrate Juvie Arkham and walked straight into an ambush. Luckily, Detective Aisi arrived just in time to help Signal make a narrow escape.

Later, The Signal met up with Detective Aisi to compare notes. Using his photokinetic sight to examine a tissue sample from one of the dead metahumans, Signal discovered trace amounts of Nth metal embedded in the skin of the sample. The metal and the sample appeared to be react Duke but also to something in the air. That is when Signal noticed a strange solar pattern radiating from the Gotham Proper housing project. Signal theorized someone must be using Gotham Proper to direct supercharged solar energy toward different sections of the city like a sundial, creating unstable metahumans across The Narrows.

Duke returns to the Batcave to bring his new theory to Bruce when the bat-computer is hijacked by someone calling himself Gnomon. He shows them a live broadcasts of The Narrows overrun with innumerable metahumans, all chanting Duke's name, as they wreak havoc across the city. Gnomon reveals that he is the one creating the metahumans. Gnomon claimed to have created the metahumans for Duke as a gift, asking Duke to join him. Duke and Bruce head out as Batman & The Signal to stop the villain.

When Batman and The Signal arrive on the scene the Batfamily are spread thin. The duo split up, with Duke making his way to confront Gnomon at Gotham Proper. Signal arrived at Gotham Proper just as Detective Aisi and the GCPD cleared the area, and the two enter the building to confront Gnomon together. In the solar observatory, Gnomon reveals he is Duke's father and that years ago his mother, Elaine, fled to Gotham to hide Duke from him. Signal can sense everything Gnomon says is true due to their genetic connection but summons the resolve to stop Gnomon anyway. Signal, with the help of Detective Aisi, manages to defeat Gnomon, who manages to escape capture.

The next day, after a breakfast with the Batfamily, Bruce congratulates Duke on a successful first day before Duke goes to see his still jokerized parents. Duke then meets up with Detective Aisi, ready to start a new day and get back on the job as the Signal.

The Outsiders
Some time after the events of Justice League: No Justice, the villain Karma lured Duke into a trap that blew up a building, killing a civilian, in the process. This attack left Duke in critical condition and kicked off a series of terrorist attacks by the villain in order to isolate Batman him from his allies. Batman responded by re-forming The Outsiders and conceded leadership of the group to Black Lightning, fearing he might compromise the team. Enlisting the help of Katana, Cassandra Cain, and a recovered Duke, the Outsiders took down Karma and officially forming the newest iteration of The Outsiders.

Still traumatized from the Karma attack, Duke and the Outsiders find themselves in a proxy war between Batman and Ra's al Ghul over the metahuman Sofia Ramos. Ra's manipulates the Outsiders, planting the cyborg Kaliber in their ranks in order to get to Sofia, in order to keep them busy and disrupt their team.

With Katana and Black Lightning preoccupied by Sofia Ramos and Kaliber, Duke was captured by Ra's' acolyte, Ishmael. Ishmael reveals he was reborn in the Lazarus Pit, changing his initial ability to steal metahuman powers into the ability to evolve and change metahuman powers. Ishmael and Ra's see potential in Duke and plan to use Ishmael's powers to evolve Duke's powers for Ra's ends. Ishmael chained, beat Duke and modifies his metahuman from his light to dark. Cassandra Cain tracks down Ishmael, defeating him in single combat, and rescuing her partner. Duke tells her he is no longer able to see the light and all he can see is darkness.

Following the transformation of his powers, Duke would defy Batman's instruction and test his new abilities on his own until Lady Shiva joined the team. taking Duke under her wing, Shiva would begin to oversee his and Cassandra's training. The Outsiders re-group and eventually defeat Ra's before pairing off and each going their separate way. Duke and Cassandra head back to Gotham together.

Death Metal

During the events of Death Metal, Prime Earth is destroyed and rewritten by the super celestial Perpetua following the defeat of the Justice League in the Justice/Doom War. As she destroys the rest of the Multiverse to remake it in her own image, The Batman Who Laughs and his army of Dark Multiverse Batmen enforce her rule. All resistance was crushed and the surviving heroes of Prime Earth were either been forced into servitude or imprisoned on New Apokolips. Wonder Woman, Batman, and Superman eventually manage to free the heroes and stormed Castle Bats (formerly Gotham City) to obtain the power necessary to restore the Multiverse; just as the Batman Who Laughs usurps Perpetua as the supreme being and becomes The Darkest Knight.

While Wonder Woman's team enacted her plan, The Signal, Orphan, Spoiler, and Red Robin fought to reclaim the section of Castle Bats that was once The Narrows. Guarding the area was Quietus, an evil Lazarus Pit infused amalgamation of Duke Thomas, Ra's al Ghul, and Batman. Quietus initially overpowered Duke and his team, using the waters of the Lazarus Pits to torture Duke with twisted visions of his history from the Dark Multiverse. Duke persevered, embracing both the light and dark powers and tapping into a new level of powers. With his newfound strength, and the aid of his team, Duke defeated Quietus and successfully reclaimed The Narrows for Gotham.

After The Darkest Knight kills Perpetua the final showdown between Woman Woman and the heroes of the Multiverse vs The Darkest Knight and his nightmarish Last 52 multiverse began. Signal was at ground zero and is the first of the heroes to witness the arrival of the earths from the dark multiverse carrying The Darkest Knight's armies. He is seen fighting a Dark Multiverse Martian Manhunter, Evil Robins, and even a variant of the Murder Machine. Ultimately Wonder Woman defeats The Darkest Knight and Omniverse is restored. The Signal is seen among the heroes at the Hall of Justice listening Superman's speech celebrating their victory.

Infinite Frontier
Following Death Metal, Duke returned to Gotham and resumed his duties as its daytime protector.

Powers and abilities
Duke's powers come from the metagene, a genetic variation caused by naturally occurring traces of Nth metal in the bloodstream. Duke inherited this genetic trait from both parents, Elaine Thomas and Gnomon, and his powers are photokinetic in nature. Gnomon has claimed that Duke possesses his immortal blood, implying Duke may possess similar immortality. His powers were originally limited to manipulating the way he processes light, but, after experiencing the touch of Ishmael, they have "evolved" into manipulating light and darkness in more abstract ways. Metahumans also appear to react on a cellular level to Duke's presence, their powers increasing in close proximity to him. It is unclear, however, to what extent he affects their actual powers.

Powers
Photokinesis: Duke is a metahuman with the photokinetic ability to absorb, redistribute, and manipulate both light and darkness. Duke's most notable ability is his "Ghost Vision", the ability to perceive the "ghosts" of where light has been to effectively see a few minutes into the past. he can also glimpse into the future by sensing the "ghosts" of where light will be. Duke's photokinetic vision is not limited to his Ghost Vision, his eyes possess a superior sensory array compared to normal humans and can detect changes or variations in light invisible to the naked eye. He can process light faster than humanly possible to the point that he can track the movement of light. he can also manipulate the light around him to radiate light, illuminate reflective surfaces (such as his chest plate) and even render himself completely invisible. Duke can also manipulate the way he processes light absorbed through his eyes to perform a variety of visual tasks, such as:

 Cosmic perception: Duke's vision can expand to perceive the entirety of, and even beyond, the known electromagnetic spectrum. He can perceive and interpret light originating from across dimensional and temporal boundaries and see into the history of a previous universe; under the right conditions.
 X-ray vision: Duke can detect and track someone through walls, ceilings, smoke and most other materials.
 Telescopic vision: Duke can focus his vision to see things at great distance, even at high speeds.
 Microscopic vision: Duke also has the ability to see extremely small objects down to the subdermal level.

Darkness manipulation: Duke's photokinetic powers include the ability to manipulate shadows and darkness. Duke can absorb darkness in the same way he absorbs light, describing his dark powers as "behaving like a tide" that pushes and pulls shadows toward himself. Duke can pull shadows into himself, revealing more light, or expel shadows from himself, enveloping everything in a wave of darkness, as well as shape and manipulate darkness to terrify and ensnare enemies or to augment his melee combat. Duke can also travel using shadows, which he can use to coordinate attacks with his allies or to make hasty escapes. Duke can also generate darkness that sparks with photoelectricity.

Photo-Umbrakinetic movement: By combining all of his photokinetic abilities, Duke can envision a path then move using light and shadows to near instantly traverse that distance. When using this ability everything around Duke appears to slow to a standstill.

Healing Factor: Gnomon, Duke's biological father, claims to be an immortal of over a thousand years and that Duke possess his "infinite blood", implying Duke may possess similar immortality. This claim is supported when it is discovered that Duke's powers allow him to heal rapidly in dire situations.

Skills and training
Duke's greatest asset is his intellect and his ability to lead. As a child, he mentally trained himself with riddles and puzzles, in an attempt to one day be able to give the Riddler a riddle he could not solve. Duke was a child prodigy, going on to compete for a Genius grant against the likes of gifted engineer Daryl Gutierrez (Mr. Bloom) at age 12. His quick-wit makes him a talented detective, figuring out the identities of Bruce Wayne as Batman, Dick Grayson as Agent 37, Damian Wayne as Robin, and Alfred as "The Nest" behind the "We Are Robin" movement. He has also developed into a charismatic leader, able to regularly gain the trust and loyalty of others, and persuading them over to his cause. Under his leadership, Duke's faction of the Robin gang rose above any others and were the driving force behind the entire "We Are Robin" movement. His ability to coordinate and rally those under his command makes him a formidable field commander, even when working with other, more experienced, Bat-family members. Duke's knack for leadership has been recognized by Batman, who has actually been training Duke for Justice League level leadership.

Duke's a highly skilled and relatively seasoned hand-to-hand combatant. As a civilian Duke demonstrated considerable fighting skills, able to hold his own against multiple opponents at once even without training. As part of the "We Are Robin" gang, Duke became proficient in the use of nunchaku and went on to receive training from Agent 37, Red Hood, Red Robin, and Robin during the events of Robin War. After leaving the Robin movement Duke went on to receive training from Bruce Wayne, studying every discipline Bruce studied to become Batman; including training in various martial arts and gaining access to drives that contained all of Batman's contingency plans, journal entries, and personal insights over the years. Duke's precognition and enhanced visual senses make him uniquely perceptive in a fight, able to detect weak points, and react to attacks faster than normally possible by slowing down his perception. He can even slow his perception down enough to catch flying projectiles. Since joining the Outsiders, Duke's training has been overseen by both Katana and Black Lightning and he trains with Cassandra Cain on a regular basis.  During this time Duke demonstrated the ability to use his shadow abilities to augment his melee combat to an extent. Lady Shiva personally mentored Duke on how to best use his new powers.

Creative writing: 
Duke is a talented writer, specifically with poetry, although he would never admit it.

Other versions
 During Futures End, Duke Thomas appears as Batman's protégé, having taken on the mantle of Robin three years after the death of Damian Wayne.
 In Batman: White Knight, Duke is an ex-special forces soldier who runs a youth group. This version of Duke unionized all the local gangs under his guidance to serve and protect Gotham's poor Backport sector, which had been neglected by the GCPD.
 Duke is the lead character in Tales from the Dark Multiverse: Dark Nights Metal, in a story where Barbatos succeeds in his takeover of Earth and Duke Thomas is one of the last heroes standing. Duke rallies the remaining heroes of his Earth to form The Final Justice League, and fought Barbatos in one last stand before the end of everything. After a battle that left him the only survivor, Duke killed Barbatos and crafted the Dragon god's skin and bone into new armor. Acquiring the Parall-Axe (an axe-like guitar that can harness the Emotional Spectrum) and dubbing himself "The Final Knight". This version of Duke remains in a never-ending battle with the monsters of the Dark Multiverse as the lone hero of countless twisted worlds.
 During the Future State event (set in the near future of the DC universe) the Bat family has been scattered after the establishment of the Magistrate and the apparent death of Batman. While still a member of The Outsiders, Duke independently became something of a political revolutionary in Gotham and began being targeted by the Magistrate as one of its most wanted criminals. Duke's identity as The Signal became public knowledge and he became the face of social resistance, holding protest rallies against the system and regularly smuggling endangered protestors out of the city to "the outside"; a safe haven outside the border of Magistrate-controlled Gotham under the protection of Katana. After learning of an assassination attempt on his life, Duke is saved by the rest of the Outsiders. Duke would come into possession of the Soultaker sword, which now housed the cursed electrical form of Jefferson Pierce (Black Lightning), whom he has vowed to cure. In the process of trying to find a cure for Black Lightning, this version of Duke ended up becoming one of the most powerful mages in the world.

Supporting characters
Duke has a number of supporting characters such as Detective Aisi, Izzy Ortiz, Riko Sheridan, and the rest of his former We Are Robin gang.

Family
Duke's family, particularly his mother Elaine Thomas, are key to his character. Elaine's mysterious past, and Duke's biological father being revealed to be Gnomon, have made Duke a person of interested to various immortals throughout the DC Universe, such as Talia al Ghul, Ra's al Ghul and The Immortal Man. Duke eventually moved to The Narrows to live with his cousin Jay, after training under Batman and living at Wayne Manor as a ward.

Enemies
The Signal's rogues' gallery consists of:

 Mr. Bloom (Daryl Gutierrez) - Duke's childhood friend and former GCPD engineer turned biokinetic villain. Bloom became obsessed with the mystery of Duke's genetics after the events of Superheavy.
 Gnomon - Duke's seemingly immortal biological father. Gnomon was using the sun to create metahumans across Gotham in Duke's name, including the metahuman delinquents of Juvie Arkham.
 The Null - The lead Juvie Arkham delinquent with the ability to create negative space, fill it with nullifying energy, and then wield it like a weapon.
 Palette - A delinquent with the ability to convert particles into black holes to create miniature universes in the form of weaponized finger paint.
 Killjoy - A delinquent with the ability to produce knives from her metallic skin and throw them with great accuracy.
 Ra's al Ghul - Ra's and Talia al Ghuls refer to Duke as a "potential" and have taken a particular interest in Duke's metahuman abilities. Ra's was the main antagonist during Duke's initial run with the Outsiders, even sending Ishmael to capture Duke in order to make him into one of his acolytes.
 Ishmael - Ra's' metahuman enforcer and loyal acolyte. Ishmael has the ability to steal or modify powers of other metahumans.
 Quietus - A Dark Multiverse amalgamation of Duke Thomas, Batman, and Ra's al Ghul.

Collected editions

In other media

Television
 A photograph of Duke appears in the Titans episode "Barbara Gordon". Dick Grayson found his picture among the possible candidates for a new Robin.
 Duke Thomas as Robin appears in Batwheels, voiced by AJ Hudson.

Webtoons
 Duke Thomas appears in the webtoon Batman: Wayne Family Adventures.

References

African-American superheroes
Batman characters
Comics characters introduced in 2014
DC Comics American superheroes
DC Comics characters who can teleport
 DC Comics characters with superhuman senses
DC Comics characters with accelerated healing
DC Comics child superheroes
DC Comics male superheroes
DC Comics metahumans
DC Comics martial artists
DC Comics sidekicks
Fictional characters who can manipulate light
Fictional characters who can manipulate darkness or shadows
Fictional characters with precognition
Fictional characters with X-ray vision
Fictional characters who can turn invisible
Fictional characters with absorption or parasitic abilities
Fictional detectives
Fictional stick-fighters
Robin (character)